Xinovrysi (before 1927: Μπεστίνικα - Bestinika) is a village in the Pelion area in Magnesia, Greece. It is part of the municipal unit of Argalasti. Xinovrysi is 3.5 km northeast of Argalasti, 7 km north of Promyri and 30 km southeast of Volos. Its population in 2011 was 164 for the village, and 213 for the community, which includes the village Potistika.

Population

History

The former name of the town was Bestinika or Bistinika (Μπεστινίκα). The historian Yannis Kordatos describes the origin of the name Bistinika that comes from the Slavic word pestinik or pecnik which means oven.  Other think that the origin of the previous name came from the Greek word for narrow, one of its areas are built in a narrow area that are filled with two and three hilltops.

During the Ottoman Period, Bestinika was the mahala of Argalasti.  In the mid-19th century, the village had 65 to 80 houses and around 325 inhabitants, cultivating olives, grapes, figs and fruits. The village was not wealthy and it did not have a school. It participated in the revolts against the Ottomans in 1821, 1823, 1854 and 1878. It is said that the Ottomans set fire to the village in the 1823 revolt.

After the liberation of Thessaly in 1881, Bestinika became a part of the municipality of Spalathra, which had its seat in Argalasti. Besides Argalasti and Bestinika the municipality also contained the villages Metochi, Bir [Μπιρ] (now Kallithea) and Ski [Σκι] (now Syki).

In 1914, Bestinika became an independent community and opened a school. In 1927, the name was officially changed to Xinovrysi, after its sour spring. During the difficult wartime periods of World War II and the Greek Civil War, and also after the wars, many of its inhabitants left for larger towns and cities including Volos. Its nearby beaches at the Aegean Sea (Mourtitsa, Potistika, Kourites and Melani) have been attracting tourists. Nevertheless, population kept declining, and the local school closed in the 1990s. In 1998, Xinovrysi became a municipal district of the enlarged municipality of Argalasti.

External links
 Xinovrysi on GTP Travel Pages

See also

List of settlements in the Magnesia regional unit

References

Populated places in Pelion